Kunratice is a municipality and village in Liberec District in the Liberec Region of the Czech Republic. It has about 400 inhabitants.

Geography
It lies in the Frýdlant Hills. The municipality is situated on the left bank of the Smědá River, which flows along the northeastern municipal border.

History
The first settlers came to the area at the turn of the 12th and 13th centuries. The first written mention of Kunratice is from 1377.

Transport
There is a road border crossing with Poland Kunratice / Bogatynia.

Sights
The landmark of Kunratice is the Church of All Saints. The originally Gothic church was first documented in 1376. It was completely rebuilt in the Baroque style in the 18th century, but several original elements have been preserved.

Twin towns – sister cities

Kunratice is twinned with:
 Pieńsk, Poland

References

External links

Villages in Liberec District